The fourth season of Australian reality television series Lego Masters aired on 18 April 2022. Hamish Blake returned as host along with Ryan "The Brickman" McNaught as judge.

Production 
Auditions for the fourth season opened in May 2021 asking for applicants 15 years old and above. During the 2021 season it was announced that the 9 Network had commissioned Hamish Blake to return to host the program for a further two seasons (until 2023). The series was filmed at Fox Studios Sydney since production was moved from Melbourne to Sydney due to Covid border restrictions.

Teams

Notes
* Not all teams in the season have an existing relationship (e.g. family or friend); some were paired together during the application process due to single applications.

Elimination history

Series Details

Challenge 1
Airdate - 18 April 2022
Challenge: "Drain The Ocean" Each of the eight teams has 16 hours to create a model of the bottom of the ocean on a circular base plate which will need to stay together under water. The models will be placed under water in a pool and the water drained. Models will be viewed from above. 
Advantage: The winner of the challenge received The Titanium Brick of Triumph which they can use to keep them safe from a future Elimination Challenge.

Challenge 2
Airdate - 19 April 2022
Challenge: "Stuntman" Each of the eight teams has six hours to create a vehicle model based on a minifig pick. Vehicles are hydraulically flung through a ring of fire and over nine yellow Lego school buses measuring a total of 5 m.Each team is scored out of ten for story-telling and style as their build exploded upon landing, plus a bonus point for the vehicle that is flung the farthest distance. This challenge is not an elimination, but the holders of the  Titanium Brick of Triumph Joss and Henry, chose their minifig and all the minifigs for each team.
Advantage: The winner of the challenge received The Titanium Brick of Triumph which they can use to keep them safe from a future Elimination Challenge.

Challenge 3 
Airdate - 20 April 2022
Challenge: "Build That Tune" The eight teams have 10 hours create a song title out of LEGO, making the story-telling clear enough that a musical mystery guest (Delta Goodrem) can guess what song they have built without the teams saying a word. Teams were not told if the build was an elimination until the end of the judging the challenge was not an elimination. Holders of the Titanium Brick of Triumph Rachael & Lexi, chose their song and all the songs for each team as songs were revealed at random from a 45 RPM jukebox record player.
Advantage: The winner of the challenge received The Titanium Brick of Triumph which they can use to keep them safe from a future Elimination Challenge.

Challenge 4 
Airdate - 24 April 2022
Advantage Challenge: "Car of the Future" The eight teams have six hours to build a car of the future. The vehicles will need to balance on a magnetic platform to achieve a hovering effect. The teams have one minute to put it on the platform, and the build must stay on in order to classed as 'floated'. The winner of the challenge received The Platinum Brick which they can use to keep them safe in the Elimination Challenge.
Elimination Challenge: "Old is New" The eight teams have 11 hours to transform an old object by bringing it to 'life'. The new build has to connect to the old object and make a cohesive story. Holders of the Titanium Brick of Triumph Gene and Nick, chose their item and the items for each team. The team with the worst design was eliminated.

Challenge 5 

 Airdate - 25 April 2022

Challenge: "Cut-Away" The seven teams have 10 hours to build something at mini-fig scale that is whole on one side and when spun around, reveals a world that has been cut in half. The contestants were not told if the challenge was an elimination it was not. Holders of the Titanium Brick of Triumph Gene and Nick, had a mystery button that had an unknown purpose which they could press at any time during the build. When pressed, the button meant that only Gene and Nick could access the Brick Pit for one hour; other contestants had only one minute to grab what they needed for that hour.
Advantage: The winner of the challenge received The Titanium Brick of Triumph which they can use to keep them safe in the Elimination Challenge.

Challenge 6 
Airdate - 26 April 2022
Challenge: "Bridge Too Far" The seven teams had seven hours to create a bridge, a minimum of 50 bricks high, that can survive two independent shake plates. If more than one bridge can survive all 12 levels of shaking, then aesthetics will decide the winner.  Holders of the Titanium Brick of Triumph, Gene and Nick, had an advantage that was not revealed until two hours into the build. The advantage was giving out the Necklace of Nuisance which requires the holders to complete an annoying task. Gene and Nick chose Branko and Max to have the Necklace of Nuisance and the team had to either sort LEGO or Max had to eat four bananas before the team could continue their build. At the five hour mark, Branko and Max had the choice of finding a blank head in a box of heads or to eat four bananas.  Max chose to eat the four bananas again
Advantage: The winner of the challenge received The Titanium Brick of Triumph which they can use to keep them safe in the Elimination

Challenge 7 
Airdate - 1 May  2022
Advantage Challenge: "Dragon Race" The seven teams have 3 hours to build tiny dragons that are small enough to fly on a drone through a course on the Sydney Cricket Ground. The team with the fastest time gets a bonus point from Hamish Blake. The winner gets an advantage for the second build.
Elimination Challenge: "Grandscapes " The seven teams have 10 hours to build a grand landscape using forced perspective. The advantage was the use of Hamish for one hour (the Brick Butler) to collect bricks from the pit. The contestants were not told it was an Elimination challenge until building was complete.

Challenge 8 
Airdate - 2 May 2022
Challenge: "Spooky" The six teams have 10 hours to build a spooky world as one of six baseplates surrounding a spooky castle, with a minifig to direct the build. The holders of the Titanium Brick of Triumph Joss & Henry, chose the minifigs for each team.
Advantage: The winner of the challenge received The Titanium Brick of Triumph which they can use to keep them safe in the Elimination Challenge. The contestants were not told if it was an Elimination until after the judging.

Challenge 9 
Airdate - 3 May 2022
Challenge: "Blown Away" The six teams have 10 hours to create a build that functions from the power of a wind machine a kinetic sculpture. Contestants were not told if the build was an elimination until the end it was not. Each build that can withstand the most wind as a percentage of maximum speed receives a bonus point from Hamish Blake. The holders of the Titanium Brick of Triumph  Joss & Henry, received motivational fan interactions with Hamish Blake.
Advantage: The winners due to a draw of the challenge received one half of The Titanium Brick of Triumph which both teams can use to keep them safe in the Elimination Challenge.

Challenge 10 
Airdate - 8 May 2022
Advantage Challenge: "High Wire" The six teams have 6 hours to build something that drags itself across a high wire at least 10 meters. The teams were not told the builds would be tested outside until the builds were completed. Whichever build makes it the furthest combined with aesthetics was declared the winner. The winner of the challenge received an advantage in the next build.
Elimination Challenge: "Secret Cities" The teams were presented with a half-built city. Teams must build in 10 hours a story that has a secret and tells the viewer what is actually going on in the facing city block. Each team was assigned a block and baseplate by Kirsti & Daniel. As the team with the advantage, they were also told to build under the baseplate, not only on top, by Brickman. The teams were not told the build was an Elimination until after the build. Henry & Joss and Gene & Nick still held The Titanium Brick of Triumph and were safe from elimination. The design with the worst story was eliminated.

Challenge 11 
Airdate - 9 May 2022
Challenge: "Window to the Future" The six teams had 12 hours to build a vision of the future as seen through the view of a window frame. Teams are given a box with studs that will be placed behind a window, and the holders of the Titanium Brick of Triumph Caleb and Alex, pressed a button with two hours remaining, and all the other teams had to move in slow motion for half an hour.
Advantage: The winner of the challenge received The Titanium Brick of Triumph which they can use to keep them safe in the Elimination Challenge, making them the first team going straight to finals week.

Challenge 12 
Airdate - 10 May 2022
Challenge: "Beginning, Middle & End" In the lead-up to finals week and a known elimination, teams have 12 hours to build a story on a rotating baseplate with three sections. The story must have a beginning, middle and an end. The story is shown through a Lego proscenium arch. The holders of The Titanium Brick of Triumph Joss & Henry, are safe from elimination.

Challenge 13 
Airdate - 15 May 2022
Challenge: "Sky's the Limit" Teams are given a LEGO cloud and have 14 hours to create something that belongs on that cloud. At the end, one team will be eliminated and the three remaining teams will compete in the final.

Grand Finale 

 Airdate - 16 May 2022
 Grand Finale Challenge - Over 28 hours, the remaining three teams are tasked with building something of their own choice yet still needing to adhere to the criteria of technical skills, story-telling elements and overall aesthetic. The Team with the most votes would be crowned LEGO Masters champions and claim the $100,000 prize plus $50 donated by Hamish Blake.
 Voting & Judgment - The 200 members of the public judged the builds, assigning their Black Bricks worth 1 vote to whichever model they liked most. Completing the vote, Brickman was given the Titanium Brick worth 100 votes.

Ratings

References 

2022 Australian television seasons
